Myang Zhuang is a Central Tai language spoken in Ronghua Township 荣华乡, Debao County, Guangxi, China.

Myang Zhuang is spoken only in Ronghua Township, in villages including Nalong (那陇屯 A2 B2 in Myang and Yang Zhuang) in Nalong Village (那陇村) and Maomei Village (A1-A A1-G in Yang Zhuang) (Liao 2016:311-312).

References

Sources
Liao Hanbo. 2016. Tonal development of Tai languages. M.A. dissertation. Chiang Mai: Payap University.

Tai languages